Ö, or ö, is a character that represents either a letter from several extended Latin alphabets, or the letter "o" modified with an umlaut or diaeresis. In languages without such vowels, the character is known as an "o with diaeresis" and denotes a syllable break, wherein its pronunciation remains an unmodified .

O-umlaut 

 
The letter o with umlaut (ö) appears in the German alphabet. The letter is often collated together with o in the German alphabet, but there are exceptions which collate it like oe or OE. The letter also occurs in some languages that have adopted German names or spellings, but it is not normally a part of those alphabets. In Danish and Norwegian, ö was previously used in place of ø in older texts to distinguish between open and closed ö-sounds. It is also used when confusion with other symbols could occur, on maps for instance. The Dano-Norwegian ø is, like the German ö, a development of oe and can be compared with the French œ.
In other languages that do not have the letter as part of the regular alphabet or in limited character sets such as ASCII, o-umlaut is frequently replaced with the digraph oe. For example, in German  (hear/listen) can be easily recognized even if spelled .

Ö in other languages 
The letter ö also occurs in two other Germanic languages: Swedish and Icelandic, but it is regarded there as a separate letter, not as an orthographic variation of the letter o. Apart from Germanic languages, it occurs in the Uralic languages such as Finnish, Karelian, Veps, Estonian, Southern Sami, and Hungarian, in the Turkic languages such as Azeri, Turkish, Turkmen, Uyghur (Latin script), Crimean Tatar, Kazakh, and in the Uto-Aztecan language Hopi, where it represents the vowel sounds . Its name in Finnish, Swedish, Icelandic, Estonian, Azeri, Turkish, Turkmen, Uyghur, Crimean Tatar, Hungarian, Votic and Volapük is Öö , not "O with two dots" since  is not a variant of the vowel  but a distinct phoneme.

In the Germanic language of Limburgish, the (ö) is used in the same way as in German.

In certain languages, the letter ö cannot be written as "oe" because minimal pairs exist between ö and oe (and also with oo, öö and öe), as in Finnish eläinkö "animal?" (interrogative) vs. eläinkoe "animal test" (cf. Germanic umlaut). If the character ö is unavailable, o is substituted and context is relied upon for inference of the intended meaning. In Volapük, ö can be written as oy, but never as oe.

In Romagnol, ö is used to represent , e.g. cöt  "cooked". In mountain dialects of Emilian, it is used to represent , e.g. tött  "all".

In the Seneca language, ö is used to represent , a back mid rounded nasalized vowel.

In Swedish, the letter ö is also used as the one-letter word for an island, which is not to be mixed with the actual letter. Ö in this sense is also a Swedish-language surname.

In the Seri language, ö indicates the labialization of the previous consonant, e.g. cöihiin  "sanderling".

Alphabetical position 
In some alphabets it is collated as an independent letter, sometimes by placing it at or near the end of the alphabet, such as after Z, Å and Ä in Swedish and Finnish, after Ý, (Z), Þ and  Æ  in Icelandic, and after V, (W), Õ and Ä in Estonian (thus fulfilling the place of omega, for example in the Finnish expression aasta ööhön "from A to Z", literally "from A to Ö". However, in Hungarian, and in the Turkish alphabet and other Turkic alphabets that have ö, it is an independent letter between o and p.

O-diaeresis 

O with diaeresis occurs in several languages that use diaereses. In these languages the letter represents a normal o, and the pronunciation does not change (e.g. in the Dutch/Afrikaans word coöperatief [cooperative]).

In English 

Some writers and publications, such as The New Yorker, use it in English words such as zoölogy and coöperate to indicate that the second vowel is pronounced separately. It is also employed in names such as Laocoön, Coös County, and the constellation Boötes. This is also done in Dutch.

Usage in phonetic alphabets 
In the Rheinische Dokumenta, a phonetic alphabet for many West Central German, the Low Rhenish, and few related vernacular languages, ö represents the close-mid front rounded vowel with the IPA notation .

The Uralic phonetic alphabet uses  as in Finnish to denote the front vowel .

Typography 

Historically O-diaeresis was written as an o with two dots above the letter. O-umlaut was written as an o with a small e written above in cursive old German (Gothic) script (Oͤ oͤ): this minute e is represented by two vertical bars connected by a slanted line, which then degenerated to two vertical bars in early modern handwritings. In most later handwritings these bars in turn nearly became dots. The origin of the letter ö was a similar ligature for the digraph OE: e was written above o and degenerated into two small dots.

In some inscriptions and display typefaces, ö may be represented as an o with a small letter e inside.

In modern typography there was insufficient space on typewriters and later computer keyboards to allow for both an O-with-dots (also representing ö) and an o-with-bars. Since they looked nearly identical, the two glyphs were combined, which was also done in computer character encodings such as ISO 8859-1. As a result, there was no way to differentiate between the different characters.

Other alphabets containing o-diaerisis include the Welsh alphabet.

Other alphabets containing o-umlaut include: the Turkmen alphabet (for the vowel [ø]), the Azerbaijani alphabet (for the vowel [œ]), the Yapese alphabet (for [œ]), the Luxembourgian alphabet (when writing loanwords from Standard German), the Slovenian alphabet (when writing loanwords from German, Hungarian and Turkish), and the Dinka alphabet. The Hungarian alphabet contains both ö and ő: double acute o is the longer pair of ö. See double acute accent.

Encoding

See also 

 Diaeresis (diacritic)
 O with diaeresis (Cyrillic)
 Ø, the character used in some nordic languages for similar sounds
 Metal umlaut

References

External links 

 The IstroRomanians in Croatia: Alphabet
 Introduction to Swedish by Urban Sikeborg, Stockholm (1997-98) 

O umlaut
O umlaut
Vowel letters